Lovsko Brdo is a small dispersed settlement above the village of Volča in the Municipality of Gorenja Vas–Poljane in the Upper Carniola region of Slovenia.

References

External links 

Lovsko Brdo on Geopedia

Populated places in the Municipality of Gorenja vas-Poljane